The 2001 Norwegian Football Cup was the 96th edition of the Norwegian Football Cup. Viking won their 5th Norwegian Championship title after defeating Bryne in the final with the score 3–0.

Calendar
Below are the dates for each round as given by the official schedule:

First round

|colspan="3" style="background-color:#97DEFF"|8 May 2001

|-
|colspan="3" style="background-color:#97DEFF"|9 May 2001

|}

Second round

|colspan="3" style="background-color:#97DEFF"|12 June 2001

|-
|colspan="3" style="background-color:#97DEFF"|13 June 2001

|-
|colspan="3" style="background-color:#97DEFF"|20 June 2001

|}

Third round

|colspan="3" style="background-color:#97DEFF"|27 June 2001

|}

Fourth round

|colspan="3" style="background-color:#97DEFF"|18 July 2001

|-
|colspan="3" style="background-color:#97DEFF"|25 July 2001

|}

Quarter-finals

Semi-finals

Final

References

External links 
 http://www.rsssf.no

Norwegian Football Cup seasons
Norwegian Football Cup
Football Cup